(–)-2-β-Carbomethoxy-3-β-(4-fluorophenyl)tropane (β-CFT, WIN 35,428) is a stimulant drug used in scientific research. CFT is a phenyltropane based dopamine reuptake inhibitor and is structurally derived from cocaine. It is around 3-10x more potent than cocaine and lasts around 7 times longer based on animal studies. While the naphthalenedisulfonate salt is the most commonly used form in scientific research due to its high solubility in water, the free base and hydrochloride salts are known compounds and can also be produced. The tartrate is another salt form that is reported.

Uses 
CFT was first reported by Clarke and co-workers in 1973. This drug is known to function as a "positive reinforcer" (although it is less likely to be self-administered by rhesus monkeys than cocaine). Tritiated CFT is frequently used to map binding of novel ligands to the DAT, although the drug also has some SERT affinity.

Radiolabelled forms of CFT have been used in humans and animals to map the distribution of dopamine transporters in the brain. CFT was found to be particularly useful for this application as a normal fluorine atom can be substituted with the radioactive isotope 18F which is widely used in Positron emission tomography. Another radioisotope-substituted analog [11C]WIN 35,428 (where the carbon atom of either the N-methyl group, or the methyl from the 2-carbomethoxy group of CFT, has been replaced with 11C) is now more commonly used for this application, as it is quicker and easier in practice to make radiolabelled CFT by methylating nor-CFT or 2-desmethyl-CFT than by reacting methylecgonidine with parafluorophenylmagnesium bromide, and also avoids the requirement for a licence to work with the restricted precursor ecgonine.

CFT is about as addictive as cocaine in animal studies, but is taken less often due to its longer duration of action. Potentially this could make it a suitable drug to be used as a substitute for cocaine, in a similar manner to how methadone is used as a substitute for opiates in treating addiction.

Street drug 

In August 2010, some media sources claimed that the designer drug Ivory Wave contained WIN 35,428. However, samples of Ivory Wave have been found to contain MDPV, so the legitimacy of these claims remains unclear.

Legal status 

CFT is not specifically scheduled in the United States, though it is considered by chemical supply companies and perhaps law enforcement to be covered under the Federal Analog Act as a Schedule II due to its close similarity in structure and function to the schedule II drug cocaine.

Toxicity 

Administering 100 mg/kg of CFT to rats only resulted in convulsions being reported, whereas CIT had the ability to cause death at this dose.

See also 
 WIN 35,065-2
 List of phenyltropanes
 List of cocaine analogues

References

Further reading 

 
 
 
 
 
 
 
 
 

Tropanes
WIN compounds
Dopamine reuptake inhibitors
Stimulants
Sympathomimetic amines
Medical imaging
Neuroimaging
Fluoroarenes
Methyl esters